An election to Dublin Corporation took place in March 1908 as part of that year's Irish local elections. The election saw Sinn Féin emerge as the second largest party on the council, although it posed little risk to the Nationalists council dominance.

Council composition following election

References

1908 Irish local elections
1908